Kelemedi Bola (born July 7, 1981 in Suva, Fiji) is a Fijian rugby union footballer. He played halfback for the Fiji Barbarians.

External links
 Profile of Kelemedi Bola

1981 births
Living people
Fijian rugby union players
Fiji international rugby union players
Sportspeople from Suva
I-Taukei Fijian people